Spiriferina is an extinct genus of brachiopods that lived from the Late Silurian to the Middle Jurassic in Asia, Europe, North America, South America, and New Zealand.

Species 
The following species have been described:

 Spiriferina abichi
 Spiriferina alia
 Spiriferina betacalcis
 Spiriferina borealis
 Spiriferina cassiana
 Spiriferina coreyi
 Spiriferina elegantissima
 Spiriferina fortis
 Spiriferina homfrayi
 Spiriferina kiparisovae
 Spiriferina munsterii
 Spiriferina nicklesi
 Spiriferina panderi
 Spiriferina papillosa
 Spiriferina rostrata
 Spiriferina roundyi
 Spiriferina rupicola
 Spiriferina salomonensis
 Spiriferina slovenica
 Spiriferina subfragilis
 Spiriferina terebratuloides
 Spiriferina terzadica
 Spiriferina tornata
 Spiriferina toulai
 Spiriferina triplicata
 Spiriferina walcotti
 Spiriferina yukonensis

References

Further reading 

 Fossils (Smithsonian Handbooks) by David Ward (Page 89)

Spiriferida
Prehistoric brachiopod genera
Silurian brachiopods
Devonian brachiopods
Carboniferous brachiopods
Permian brachiopods
Triassic brachiopods
Jurassic brachiopods
Paleozoic brachiopods of Asia
Paleozoic brachiopods of Europe
Paleozoic brachiopods of North America
Paleozoic brachiopods of South America
Triassic Colombia
Silurian first appearances
Middle Jurassic extinctions
Fossil taxa described in 1847